The Winther was an automobile manufactured in Winthrop Harbor, Illinois and Kenosha, Wisconsin, USA, by the Winther Motors Sales Corporation between 1920 and 1923. The company had been building trucks and fire appliances since 1917,  and decided to broaden its production.

The Model Six-61 was a 5-passenger touring car that was powered by a Herschell-Spillman 11000 six-cylinder engine. The Six-61 had a 120-inch wheelbase, and sold for $2890. "Designed for critic - Built by mechanics" was the advertising slogan for the Model Six-61.

The price for the Six-61 was reduced to $2250 for 1922, but production was discontinued in early 1923 after 336 cars had been built.

The body patterns were sold to GD Harris of Menasha, Wisconsin, who continued production of the car as the "Harris Six".

References

External links
Line drawing of 1921 Model Six-61

Vintage vehicles
Defunct motor vehicle manufacturers of the United States
Kenosha, Wisconsin